James Bentley Wilson (July 8, 1896 – September 25, 1986) was an American football player and coach. He served as the head football coach at the University at Buffalo from 1932 to 1933 and again from 1950 to 1951 and at Canisius College from 1939 to 1942 and again from 1948 to 1949, compiling a career college football record of 40–30–7.

Head coaching record

References

External links
 

1896 births
1986 deaths
American football ends
Buffalo All-Americans players
Buffalo Bulls football coaches
Canisius Golden Griffins football coaches
Cornell Big Red football players
Sportspeople from Buffalo, New York
Coaches of American football from New York (state)
Players of American football from Buffalo, New York